This is a list of players who played at least one game for the Birmingham Bulls of the World Hockey Association from 1976–77 to 1978–79.



A
Rick Adduono,
Steve Alley,
Danny Arndt,

B
Terry Ball,
Frank Beaton,
Serge Beaudoin,
Gilles Bilodeau,

C
Wayne Carleton,
Tony Cassolato,
Keith Crowder,
Rick Cunningham,

D
Wayne Dillon,
Steve Durbano,

E
Chris Evans,

F
Richard Farda,
Peter Folco,

G
Gord Gallant,
John Garrett,
Gaston Gingras,
Dave Gorman,
Michel Goulet,

H
David Hanson,
Rich Hart,
Craig Hartsburg,
Paul Heaver,
Paul Henderson,
Dale Hoganson,
Brent Hughes,

J
Jeff Jacques,

K
Gavin Kirk,
Keith Kokkola,

L
Jean-Guy Lagace,
Rod Langway,
Ken Linseman,

M
Frank Mahovlich,
Peter Marrin,
Jim Marsh,
Ray McKay,

N
Mark Napier,
Vaclav Nedomansky,
Lou Nistico,
Joe Noris,

O
Paul O'Neil,

P
Jean-Luc Phaneuf,

R
Rob Ramage,
Pat Riggin,
Phil Roberto,
Jerry Rollins,

S
Buzz Schneider,
Timothy Sheehy,
Tom Simpson,
Louis Sleigher,
Bob Stephenson,
John Stewart (born 1950),
John Stewart (born 1954),
Dave Syvret,

T
Greg Tebbutt,
Paul Terbenche,
Jim Turkiewicz,

V
Rick Vaive,

W
Ernie Wakely,
Pat Westrum,
Wayne Wood,

References
Birmingham Bulls (WHA) all-time player roster at hockeydb.com

Birmingham Bulls
Birmingham Bulls players